Muhammad Idrees Khan Safi (Urdu: محمد ادریس خان صافی) is a Pakistani Politician and Member of Senate of Pakistan, currently serving as Chairperson- Senate Committee on Information Technology and Telecommunication.

Political career
He belongs to FATA region of Pakistan, and was elected to the Senate of Pakistan in March 2009 on a general seat from FATA region. He is the chairperson of Chairperson- Senate Committee on Information Technology and Telecommunication and member of senate committees of Railways, States and Frontier Regions, Industries and Production.

See also
 List of Senators of Pakistan
 Ayatullah Durrani
 Abdul Haseeb Khan

References

External links
Senate of Pakistan Official Website

Living people
Members of the Senate of Pakistan
Independent politicians in Pakistan
Year of birth missing (living people)